The Saudi Arabia national futsal team is controlled by the Saudi Arabian Football Federation and represents Saudi Arabia at international futsal competitions.

Results

2022

2023

Tournaments

FIFA Futsal World Cup

AFC Futsal Championship

Asian Indoor and Martial Arts Games

Arab Futsal Championship

GCC Futsal Cup

WAFF Futsal Championship

2022 WAFF Futsal Championship

Palestine 	1–2	 Saudi Arabia

Saudi Arabia 	4–5	 Kuwait

Saudi Arabia 	3–2	 Iraq

Saudi Arabia 	4–3	 Oman

Saudi Arabia 	3–5	 Kuwait

2022 GCC Games

Bahrain  1-3 Saudi Arabia

Saudi Arabia  2-3 Kuwait

UAE  5-2 Saudi Arabia

Saudi Arabia 3-0 Oman

References

External links
Saudi Arabia FA official website 

Saudi Arabia
National sports teams of Saudi Arabia
Futsal in Saudi Arabia